Echo is a 1997 Iranian Drama film Written and directed by Hossein Shahabi (Persian: حسین شهابی)

Starring
 Fariba Mortazavi
 Mohammad Sadegi
 Mohammad Taheri
 Reza Sabri
 Amir Ahmadi
 Nasim Mehrani
 Karim Novin

Crew
 Producer: Mansour Sharifian
 cinematography: Kazem Sarvar
 Sound Recorder: Ali koohzad
 Costume Designer: Fariba Mortazavi
 Music: Hossein Shahabi
 Make Up: Sahar Amini
 Produced In Kish TV Iran 1997

References

1997 films
Iranian drama films
Films directed by Hossein Shahabi